Pierre Maurice Eugène Tastemain (6 September 1878, Caen – March 1944, Paris) was a French painter and stained glass artist.

Biography 
His artistic talents were noticed by his teachers at an early age, so he became the student of the local artist and Professor, Gustave Ménégoz (1858–1934). In 1894, he participated in a competition organized by the Société Nationale des Beaux-Arts.

There, he entered the Académie Julian and worked in the studios of Raphaël Collin. He took two trips to Italy, and was introduced to stained glass techniques. In 1906, he took some additional training with Ferdinand Humbert. That same year, he had his first exhibit at the Salon.

After serving in the Army during World War I, he was commissioned to do restorative glass work at several churches in Paris. Eventually, he was successful enough to buy a country home in Clécy, where he spent his summers.

He continued to exhibit frequently, winning a bronze medal at the Exposition Internationale des Arts et Techniques dans la Vie Moderne in 1937. The following year, he was named a Knight in the Legion of Honor.

Source 
 "Maurice Tastemain", Dictionnaire Bénézit, Oxford Art Online, 2011

External links 

1878 births
1944 deaths
20th-century French painters
French landscape painters
French stained glass artists and manufacturers
Académie Julian
Artists from Caen
French military personnel of World War I